Hypselodoris obscura is a species of colourful sea slug or dorid nudibranch, a marine gastropod mollusk in the family Chromodorididae. It is the type species of the genus Hypselodoris.

This species eats sponges.

Distribution

This nudibranch was described from Port Jackson, Australia. It is a warm temperate species only found in Southeastern Australia. It is related to the widespread tropical species Hypselodoris infucata and the similar Australian species Hypselodoris saintvincentia.

Description
Hypselodoris obscura has a mottled appearance due to a grey or grey-blue background colour with yellow and black spots, which vary considerably in size between individuals. There is a paler stripe down the midline. The edge of the mantle is pale blue alternating with yellow. The gills and rhinophores are bright red.

References

Chromodorididae
Gastropods described in 1855